Bhamidipati Ramagopalam (1932–2010), also known as Bharago, was a writer of short stories, critiques and novels in Telugu. He received the Central Sahitya Academy Award in 1991 for the book Itlu mee vidheyudu.

Education 
Ramagopalam had regular schooling from Form III onwards at M.R. Branch College and later graduated with a B.A. in Economics in 1951 from M.R. Degree College, Vizianagaram.

Adaptations 
His short stories have been adapted into mini-series in Telugu by Doordarshan.

Awards 

Best humour writer award of Telugu University (1990)
Central Sahitya Academy Award (1991)
Kurella Sahithi Award (1994)
Kalasagara (Chennai) Award (1997)

Works

Novels 
Kundapenkulu (1961)
Sparsa Rekha (1984)
Nakee Udyogam Vaddu (1988)

Stories 
Vantochina Mogudu (1966)
Vennela Needa (1997)
Kadhanakutoohalam (1985)
Itlu Mee Vidheyudu (1990)
Sarada and Kulasa Kadhalu (1997)

Others 
Kalpasootram from Prakrit into Telugu
116 Telugu film songs of the period 1942-73 under the name 'Noota padaharlu(2001)'
Telugu film songs under the name 'Maro Noota padaharlu'(2005)
Anusthana Bhagavadgeetha (2001)
Several commemoration volumes (souvenir) which included the ones on great personalities like Dwaram Venkataswamy Naidu, P. Bhanumathi, R. Balasaraswathi Devi, Palagummi Padmaraju, and Raavi Sastry.
Souvenir on Suseela

Biography 
‘Aaramagopalam’ - An autobiography of noted short-story and humour
Translation of the biography of Asutosh Mukherjee from English into Telugu

References

External links 

http://newindianexpress.com/states/andhra_pradesh/article191891.ece
http://www.koumudi.net/gollapudi/041210_bharago.html
http://www.tana.org/events/tana-and-community-news/2010/04/13/a-tribute-to-bhamidipati-ramagopalam-(bharago)-by-chowdary-v-jampala 

1932 births
2010 deaths
Telugu writers
Recipients of the Sahitya Akademi Award in Telugu
People from Vizianagaram
Indian humorists
Indian male short story writers
20th-century Indian short story writers
Telugu-language writers
Indian male novelists
20th-century Indian novelists
Novelists from Andhra Pradesh
20th-century Indian male writers